Spialia doris, the Aden skipper or desert grizzled skipper, is a butterfly of the family Hesperiidae. It is found in Morocco, Egypt, Saudi Arabia, United Arab Emirates, Somalia and India. In the Atlas mountains it is found at heights of 400 to 1,750 meters above sea-level.

The wingspan is 22–26 mm. Adults are on wing from March to May and from August to September in two generations.

The larvae feed on Convolvolus lanatus, Convolvolus caputmedusae, Convolvolus trabutianus and Ipomoea species.

Subspecies
Spialia doris doris (Sudan, northern Kenya, Somalia, Djibouti, Saudi Arabia, Yemen, Oman, Arabia, southern Iran, Pakistan)
Spialia doris amenophis (Reverdin, 1914) (northern Egypt: Nile Valley)
Spialia doris daphne Evans, 1949 (Mauritania, south-western Morocco)
Spialia doris evanida  (Butler, 1880) (southern Turkmenia, southern Uzbekistan)

References

External links

euroButterflies

Spialia
Butterflies of Asia
Butterflies described in 1951